White Pine Ski Area and Resort is a ski resort located  from Pinedale, Wyoming in northern Sublette County. The mountain holds about 25 trails of differing challenge. Of the trails, 25% are beginner, 45% are intermediate and 30% of the trails are advanced.
Along with downhill skiing, the resort also offers several groomed trails for cross country skiing. The resort features cabins available to rent as well as daily food service and ski school. The previous of the lodge was constructed in 1999. However the lodge burned to the ground on the night of July 11th, 2019. 
White Pine Ski Resort's regular season usually runs annually between Thanksgiving and Easter. The resort has a ski shop located in Pinedale, which both rents and sells ski and snowboarding equipment. The resort houses three quad lifts, two of which are in current operation, the other being a tow rope.

Off season
During the summer, White Pine Ski Resort offered downhill mountain biking, with fourteen trails to choose from, some with wood planks to ride on. The resort houses a day camp during the month of June, as well as horseback riding and overnight camping, in the nearby Wind River Range.

References

External links

Youtube commercial for White Pine

Ski areas and resorts in Wyoming
Buildings and structures in Sublette County, Wyoming